Ian Clyde (born May 15, 1956 in Verdun, Quebec) is a retired boxer from Canada, who represented his native country at the 1976 Summer Olympics. After defeating Charlie Magri of Great Britain, he was defeated in the quarterfinals of the men's flyweight division (– 51 kilograms) by Cuba's eventual silver medalist Ramón Duvalón. Clyde won a silver medal at the 1978 Commonwealth Games and a bronze medal at the 1979 Pan American Games. He also competed at the 1975 Pan American Games. 
Ian Clyde has followed his career as a professional athlete to offer personal fitness boxing coaching and competitive boxing instruction to young athletes in Montreal.

1976 Olympic results
Below are the results of Ian Clyde, a Canadian flyweight boxer who competed at the 1976 Montreal Olympics:

 Round of 64: bye
 Round of 32: defeated Alick Chiteule (Zambia) by walkover
 Round of 16: defeated Charlie Magri (Great Britain) by a third-round knockout
 Quarterfinal: lost to Ramón Duvalón (Cuba) by decision, 0-5

References

External links
 Canadian Olympic Committee
 Profile

1956 births
Living people
Anglophone Quebec people
Flyweight boxers
Boxers at the 1975 Pan American Games
Boxers at the 1976 Summer Olympics
Olympic boxers of Canada
Boxers at the 1978 Commonwealth Games
Boxers at the 1979 Pan American Games
People from Verdun, Quebec
Boxers from Montreal
Commonwealth Games silver medallists for Canada
Pan American Games bronze medalists for Canada
Canadian male boxers
Commonwealth Games medallists in boxing
Pan American Games medalists in boxing
Medalists at the 1979 Pan American Games
Medallists at the 1978 Commonwealth Games